Stan Lee's World of Heroes is a YouTube-funded channel on YouTube. The channel was created by Stan Lee.

History
The first video posted onto World of Heroes, on April 17, 2012, is an episode of a program on the channel, Fan Wars. Other programs on the channel include Stan Lee's Super Model, Head Cases, Bad Days, Stan Lee's Academy of Heroes, Stan's Rants, UnCONventional, Geek D.I.Y., and Cocktails w/ Stan. Vuguru and POW! Entertainment, who pitched the idea of the channel and collaborated to create the channel, unveiled the channel at the San Diego Comic-Con in 2012. The show, Stan's Rants, is based on Lee's old Soapbox column. Felicia Day has appeared in an episode of Cocktails w/ Stan.

In 2012, Lee discussed World of Heroes in a Q&A session at the New York Comic Con.

External links
 Google+
 Stan Lee's Academy of Heroes
 Fan Wars the Series.com at archive.org
  - YouTube channel
 SL WOH.com San Lee's World of Heroes.com at archive.org

References

YouTube-funded channels
Works by Stan Lee
YouTube channels launched in 2012